Lekhnath may refer to:
 Lekhnath, Former municipality in Kaski District, Nepal
 Lekhnath Paudyal, Nepali writer
 Lekh Nath Acharya, Nepali politician
 Lekh Nath Neupane, Nepali politician
 Radio Lekhnath,  Radio station in Pokhara